Tushmanlu or Tush Manlu may refer to:
 Tushmanlu, Ardabil
 Tush Manlu, East Azerbaijan